The Karnataka Sahitya Akademi Award for Poetry is an annual award given by the Karnataka Sahitya Academy recognizing the best poetry of the year written in Kannada language and published in India.

Winners

See also 
 List of poetry awards
 Indian poetry

References

Kannada poetry
Awards established in 1963
Indian literary awards
Poetry awards